Usherbreen is a glacier in Sabine Land at Spitsbergen, Svalbard. It has a length of about 9.5 kilometers, and is located between Kroghfjellet and Domen. Usherbreen is a tributary glacier to Nordmannsfonna, and debouches towards Storfjorden. It is named after Scottish businessman Thomas Leslie Usher.

See also
Usherfjellet

References

Glaciers of Spitsbergen